Nii Narku Quaynor is a Ghanaian scientist and engineer who has played an important role in the introduction and development of the Internet throughout Africa.

Biography
Quaynor graduated in engineering science from Dartmouth College in 1972, and received a Bachelor of Engineering degree from the Thayer School of Engineering in 1973. He then studied Computer Science, obtaining an M.S. from the State University of New York at Stony Brook in 1974, and a Ph.D. from the same institution in 1977. He attended the Kinbu Secondary Technical School, Adisadel College and Achimota School in Ghana.

He is one of the founding members of the Computer Science Department at the University of Cape Coast in Ghana, and continues to hold a professorship there. He is also a member of the Council of the University of Ghana.

In 2000, he became director of ICANN for the African region.

Work with telecommunications and the Internet
On Quaynor's return to Ghana from the United States in the early 1990s, he established some of Africa's first Internet connections and was involved in setting up some key organisations, including the African Network Operators Group (AfNOG). He introduced Value Added Networks in the region through the introduction of the SWIFT, Internet and Commerce networks, and was founding chairman of AfriNIC, the African numbers registry.

Quaynor is the Chairman of the Ghanaian company Network Computer Systems, and a member of the United Nations Secretary General Advisory Group on ICT, member of the ITU Telecom Board, chair and of the OAU Internet Task Force, President of the Internet Society of Ghana, and member of the Worldbank Infodev TAP.

Quaynor also serves as a Commissioner for the Global Commission on Internet Governance.

Awards and recognition
He was awarded the 2015 ICANN Multi-stakeholder Ethos Award together with Cheryl Langdon Orr Also on 26 June 2013, he was selected for induction into the Internet Hall of Fame by the Internet Society. In December 2007, Quaynor was awarded the Jonathan B. Postel Service Award from the IETF (The Internet Engineering Task Force).

References

External links
Profile of Quaynor on CNN International's African Voices, September 2, 2013

Ghanaian engineers
Ghanaian scientists
Living people
Thayer School of Engineering alumni
Stony Brook University alumni
Year of birth missing (living people)
Internet in Africa
Place of birth missing (living people)
Alumni of Achimota School
Academic staff of the University of Cape Coast
Alumni of Adisadel College